The Indochinese shrew (Crocidura indochinensis) is a species of white-toothed shrew native to Southeast Asia. It was first identified in 1922 by Herbert C. Robinson and C. Boden Kloss. The species is often taxonomized as a subspecies Horsfield's shrew, but bears a different range, occurring in Myanmar, Vietnam, and the Yunnan province of China. C. indochinensis is on the smaller end of shrews, with dark brownish gray fur and a long, slender tail.

References 

Crocidura